Daedongyeojido (also Daedong yeojido, lit. "The Great Map of the East Land") is a large scale map of Korea produced by Joseon dynasty cartographer and geologist Kim Jeong-ho in 1861. A second edition was printed in 1864. One source describes it as the "oldest map in Korea". Daedongyeojido is considered very advanced for its time, and marks the zenith of pre-modern Korean cartography.

Description

The scale of the map is 1:162,000. The map was printed from 70  basswood woodblocks, engraved on both sides. The techniques to create the map have been described as a hybrid of Korean and Western methods.

The map is praised for precise delineations of mountain ridges, waterways, and transportation routes. It also has markings for settlements, including villages, as well as notable administrative and cultural areas and sites, such as past and present government offices and military sites, public warehouses, government horse ranches, beacon fire mounds, and royal tombs.

Several versions of the map exist, with some variations (such as the number of booklets, either 21 or 22). The map was accompanied by a preface explaining the methodology, and a legend, as well as additional statistics, and a separate map for the Korean capital of Seoul.

In 1898, the Japanese Army secretly hired 1,200 Japanese survey engineers and two to three hundred Koreans to secretly survey the geography of Joseon to create 300 copies of a 50,000th map by surveying the country. After learning about the existence of Daedongyeojido, they were surprised to learn that the map was not much different from the map they had worked hard on.

100,000-won banknote controversy
In 2008 the map was considered as an image for one of the 100,000-won banknotes, which would have been the highest-denomination South Korean banknote to date. However, the map of Daedongyeojido did not portray the internationally disputed Liancourt Rocks (known as Dokdo islands in Korea), and the ensuing public debate in Korea over whether the map on a banknote should be changed to include them made the image too controversial for such a high-visibility placement. Eventually, the 100,000-won banknote was cancelled due to the controversy stirred by the issue.

See also
 Geography of Korea

References

External links
 Map held at the American Geographical Society Library, UW Milwaukee

1860s in Korea
Historic maps of Asia
Maps of Korea
1861 works
2008 controversies
19th-century maps and globes